The Gatineau Loppet, earlier known as Rivière Rouge, Gatineau 55 and Keskinada Loppet, is an international cross-country ski competition where  close to 2,500 skiers of all ages and levels come together on the trails of Gatineau Park, in Gatineau, Quebec, Canada. A member of the Worldloppet league, it is part of a circuit of the 20 biggest cross-country ski races around the world, including the Vasaloppet in Sweden, and La Tranjurassienne in France. The Gatineau Loppet takes place over a weekend in February, with 8 cross-country ski races, 3 snowshoe races and 3 fat bike races. It has been held since 1979, and has been part of Worldloppet since then.

References

External links

Official website

Ski marathons
1979 establishments in Canada
Skiing in Quebec
February sporting events
Recurring sporting events established in 1979
Cross-country skiing competitions in Canada